Salgótarjáni Barátok Torna Club is a Hungarian football club from the town of Salgótarján.

History
Salgótarjáni Barátok Torna Club debuted in the 1935–36 season of the Hungarian League and finished third.

Name Changes 
1920–1922: Salgótarjáni Torna Club
1922–1949: Salgótarjáni Bányatelepi Torna Club
1949–1951: Salgótarjáni Tárna Sport Egyesület
1951–?: Salgótarjáni Bányász Sport Kör
?-1977: Salgótarjáni Bányász Torna Club
1977: merger with Egyesült a Salgótarjáni Kohász SE 
1977–1984: Salgótarjáni Torna Club
1984: exit as Salgótarjáni Kohász SE 
1984–1988: Salgótarjáni Bányász Torna Club
1988–1992: Salgótarjáni Barátság Torna Club
1992: Salgótarjáni Síküveg SE joined
1992–1993: Salgótarjáni Barátság Torna Club-Salgglas Sport Egyesület
1993: Salgótarjáni Síküveg SE exit
1993–2001: Salgótarjáni Barátság Torna Club
2001–2012: Salgótarjáni Barátok Torna Club
2003: Salgó Öblös-Faipari SC joined
2012–?: Salgótarjáni Barátok Torna Club-Puebla
?-: Salgótarjáni Barátok Torna Club

Honours
Hungarian Cup:
 Runner-up (1) :1940–41

External links
 Profile

References

Football clubs in Hungary
1920 establishments in Hungary
Mining association football clubs in Hungary
Association football clubs established in 1920